The 1914 South Sydney Rabbitohs season was the 7th in the club's history. The club competed in the New South Wales Rugby Football League Premiership (NSWRFL), finishing the season as minor premiers, and thus, were that season's premiers. In the knock-out competition, the City Cup, South Sydney advanced to the grand final, however, they lost to Eastern Suburbs 5 – 6

Ladder

Fixtures

Regular season

City Cup

Statistics

References

South Sydney Rabbitohs seasons
South Sydney season